SS Appomattox was a 3,338 ton banana boat of the Fyffes Line.

History
She was built in 1893 for the Chesapeake & Ohio Steam Ship Company (hence the Virginian name) and sold to Elders & Fyffes in 1902.  She undertook occasional work for the United Fruit Company until 1910, when she was sold to M. Gumuchdjian, of Turkey and renamed Seyyar.  She was sunk off Karasu by Russian warships on 12 March 1916.

Notes and references

Banana boats
1893 ships
Ships built on the River Tees
Merchant ships of the United Kingdom
Ships of the Ottoman Empire
Maritime incidents in 1916
World War I shipwrecks in the Black Sea